Mt. Torry Furnace, also known as Virginia Furnace, is a historic iron furnace located at Sherando, Augusta County, Virginia. It was built in 1804, and is a stone square trapezoid measuring 30 feet at the base and 40 feet tall. The original cold-blast charcoal stack was converted for hot blast in 1853. It shut down in 1855, then was reactivated in 1863 to support the Confederate States Army. The furnace was destroyed in June 1864 during the American Civil War by Brigadier General Alfred N. Duffié, then rebuilt in January 1865.  It operated until 1884.

It was listed on the National Register of Historic Places in 1974.

References

Industrial buildings and structures on the National Register of Historic Places in Virginia
Industrial buildings completed in 1804
Buildings and structures in Augusta County, Virginia
National Register of Historic Places in Augusta County, Virginia
Industrial furnaces